Akkarin Kitwijarn (born 8 July 1995) is a male Thai taekwondo practitioner who was the silver medalist at the 2014 Asian Games in the under 49 kg class. Kitwijarn he also lose gold medals at the 2014 Asian Games and at the Asian Taekwondo Championships in 2014 Asian Taekwondo Championships

References

1995 births
Living people
Akkarin Kitwijarn
Asian Games medalists in taekwondo
Taekwondo practitioners at the 2014 Asian Games
Akkarin Kitwijarn
Medalists at the 2014 Asian Games
Akkarin Kitwijarn
Southeast Asian Games medalists in taekwondo
Competitors at the 2015 Southeast Asian Games
Asian Taekwondo Championships medalists
Akkarin Kitwijarn
Akkarin Kitwijarn